Kowethas an Yeth Kernewek (The Cornish Language Fellowship)
is a Cornish language association which exists to promote,
encourage and foster the use of the Cornish language. It is represented on the Cornish Language Partnership.

Unlike other Cornish language organisations, Kowethas an Yeth 
Kernewek recognises the validity of all forms of revived Cornish,
and membership is open to all.

Nevertheless, although its members use all forms of Cornish, the society has long been associated by many with a particular spelling system called Kernewek Kemmyn.  As a result, Kowethas an Yeth Kernewek received a boost in its membership after 1987 when The Cornish Language Board itself  adopted, and declared its support for, Kernewek Kemmyn.
It received a further boost when Paul Dunbar and Ken George claimed in their book Cornish for the 21st Century, published in 1997, that criticisms of this system were without foundation, as by that time Kernewek Kemmyn was very widely used - a large  majority of people sitting examinations in the Cornish language were choosing to be examined in Kernewek Kemmyn.
  
Kowethas an Yeth Kernewek respects the rights of its members to use whichever form of Cornish they choose, although its written business is conducted in Kernewek Kemmyn because that is the form used by the majority of its members.

Every month the society publishes a Cornish Language magazine 
called An Gannas which consists of articles, stories, news, 
comment and puzzles. Publishing is an important aspect of the 
work of the society.  Amongst the variety of materials that have 
been produced are books, diaries, stories and language learning 
materials.  Books with accompanying tapes and CDs are also published 
to assist beginners.  The society also produces tea-towels, mugs, 
car stickers, pens, cards, T-shirts and other items for sale, 
all displaying the Cornish language.  During the year the society 
organises a number of language days, often supported by 
Cornish music or dancing, giving Cornish speakers the opportunity 
of meeting together in a Cornish speaking environment.

The society is closely associated with the running of Cornish classes 
throughout Cornwall and beyond.  It maintains links with a wide 
range of other cultural organisations both in Cornwall and beyond, 
including language and educational organisations in other Celtic 
countries.  The society is a voluntary body, (charity no. 1065527) 
and its funding is raised through grants, membership, sales and 
donations.

See also

Languages in the United Kingdom

References

External links
Website of the Kowethas an Yeth Kernewek

Cornish language
Cornish culture
Celtic language advocacy organizations